Gao'an is a county-level city in the northwest-central part of Jiangxi province, China. It is under the jurisdiction of the prefecture-level city of Yichun, and is located about 35 kilometers west from Nanchang, the provincial capital. It covers an area of 2439.33 square kilometers and has an estimated population of 1 million people. In 1993, it became a city comprising 20 smaller towns.  It is well known for calligraphy and a thriving ceramics industry.

History
Gao'an County, founded in 201 B.C. was named Jiancheng. Its administrative divisions today include Gao'an, Shanggao, Yifeng, Wangzai, and a part of Zhangshu.

In 4 A.D., Jiancheng County was changed into Duoju County, and then named Jiancheng again in 25 A.D. From 184 to 189, a part of Jiancheng was marked out to Shangcai County (now Shanggao County). In the late Eastern Han Dynasty (4 A.D.), under the "Three Kingdoms" situation, and Jiancheng County belonged to Sunwu power. From 22 to 228, respectively marked out a part of Jiancheng and Shangcai to be Yicheng County and Yangle County (now Wanzai County).

During Jin and Southern Dynasties, Jiancheng County still belonged to Yuzhang Shire. In 589, Sui Dynasty united the country, abolished Shangcai, merged Yangle, and then Yicheng belonged to Jiancheng again. At that time, Jiancheng County was changed into Hongzhou.

In 622, in order to avoid the name to be same with the Prince Li Jiancheng, the county was named as Gao'an. According to Taiping Huanyuji, "the terrain is high but flat, so name it Gao'an". (Gao in Chinese means high, An in Chinese means flat.) In 624, Gao'an belonged to Yunzhou.

During five dynasties and ten states period, Gao'an belonged to Wu power at first, but was administrated by Nantang power later. In 981, marked out a part of Gao'an and Shanggao to be Xinchang County (now Yifeng County). In 1225, because the "Yun" in Yunzhou was the same pronunciation with the emperor Zhao Yun, and also at that time found a previous ganoderma lucidum in the mountain, which was regarded as a very auspicious sign, and then the name became Ruizhou (Juichow) ("Rui" in Chinese means auspicious sign). Therefore, Gao'an belonged to Ruizhou.

In 1932, the whole province was divided into 13 administrative regions, and Gao'an belonged to the first region. In 1935, there were 8 administrative regions, and Gao'an became one of the second region. In 1942, it adjusted to have 9 administrative regions, and Gao'an belonged to the first one again.
On July 10, 1949, Gao'an got liberated. 4 days later, Gao'an government was established, and belonged to Nanchang, Jiangxi province. Later on, Gao'an belonged to Yichun.

On December 8, 1993, the state council approved Gao'an to be a prefecture-level city, and governed by Yichun.

Geography

Location
Gao'an is located in the northwest-central of Jiangxi province, and belongs to [Middle-lower Yangtze Plain]. It covers an area of 2439 square kilometers.

Topography
The northern terrain in Gao'an is high, the southern is low, and the middle part is flat with hills, valleys and plains. The area of hills is 926.915 square kilometers, which is 38% of the total area. Water area is 254.343 square kilometers, which occupies 10.4%.
The altitude is between 40 and 100 meters. The north has extension of nine ridge mountains,the south has extension of Mengshan and Moshan, and the south-center has Heling and Fengling.Hua Linsaiin the north is the highest point in Gao'an, with the altitude of 800 meters.

Rivers
The main rivers are the Jin River and the Xiao River. The Jin River flows from west to east, winding to the center of the city, arrives in Xinjian District and finally flows into the Gan River. The Xiao River passes the edge of the south, arrives in Fengcheng and also flows into the Gan River.

Climate
Gao'an is subtropical monsoon climate with four seasons, abundant rainfall, sufficient sunlight and long period of Frost-free. The annual average rainfall is 1677 mm. Rainy days are mainly between April and July, and the rainfall takes over 60% of the total, but it is easy to cause floods. From August to October, the rainfall is less and drought is easy to happen. The temperature varies from -13.1 °C to 41.1 °C, and the average temperature all around year is about 18.1 °C.

Scenic spots

Hua Linsai
It is located in Hualin Mountain of Gao'an, which is about 62 kilometers away from the city. It is the city's highest point.

Hao Helou
Hao Helou is a special architecture in Taiyang town, which is 47 kilometers away from the city center. This building was founded in late period of Ming Dynasty. It is famous as its special structure.

Da Guanlou

It stands at the north bank of Jinjiang, and also at the front of the government building. It was established in Tang Dynasty, with many reconstructions, finally in 1985, it became an important scenic spot.

Local specialty
The local specialty is fuzhu, a collection of rolled-up dried tofu strips. It has a long history because of the excellent soybean ingredient and unique water quality of Jinhe. Gao'an fuzhu is of good quality, rich nutrition, and is a national, provincial and municipally-recognized item. The product is sold in more than 20 provinces and cities, and even international markets; some products have been sold to the United States, Kuwait and other countries.

Administrative divisions
In the present,Gao'an City has 2 subdistricts, 18 towns and 2 townships. 
2 subdistricts
 Ruizhou
 Junyang

18 towns

2 townships
 Shanghu
 Wangjiaxu

Demographics

Transportation
The city is served by Gao'an railway station on the Hangzhou–Changsha high-speed railway.

Notes and references

External links
  Government site - 
  Gao'an government net
  Information of Gao'an

Administrative subdivisions of Jiangxi
Cities in Jiangxi